The Orange Peel is a music venue located in downtown Asheville, North Carolina. It has a capacity of 1,050 people and has hosted many well known acts, including 311 (in '08, '09 x2 & '11), Modest Mouse,  Tegan and Sara, Black Label Society,  Umphrey's McGee in '03, Bob Dylan in '04, Chevelle in '05,  Smashing Pumpkins (residency in '07),  the Beastie Boys in '09, The Black Keys, Lauryn Hill in '17, Ice Cube, Skrillex, Deadmau5, Bassnectar, Pretty Lights, The Glitch Mob, Wax Tailor, Medeski, Martin, and Wood, Queens of the Stone Age in '07, Mastodon in '11, Breaking Benjamin in '17, Megadeth, GWAR (from VA), Lamb of God (from VA), Decapitated, Silversun Pickups in '16, The Dirty Heads in '18, and The Struts (from the UK) in '18. It was also a host venue for the annual Moogfest electronic music festival, which showcases the latest and greatest in electronic music.

The Orange Peel has also hosted Asheville's Warren Haynes in '13 for the Christmas Pre-Jam, Asheville's Chase Rice in '17, Rainbow Kitten Surprise (from Boone) in '18, Ben Folds (from Winston-Salem/Chapel Hill) in '09, Daughtry (from NC) in '08, Southern Culture on the Skids in '02, Ben Taylor (son of James Taylor) Band in '03, Avett Brothers (from the Charlotte area) in '08, Carolina Chocolate Drops (an old time string band from Durham) in '12, Kellie Pickler in '11, Greenville's Edwin McCain in '03, Knoxville's 10 Years in '08, Nashville's Kings of Leon in '07, Moon Taxi in '16, Judah & the Lion in '18, Columbia's Hootie & the Blowfish in '03, Toro y Moi in '18, Charleston's Jump, Little Children in '03, Band of Horses in '09,  Duncan Sheik in '03, Trevor Hall (from SC) in '06, Atlanta's Manchester Orchestra in '14, Gregg Allman Band in '02, Chris Robinson Brotherhood (Black Crowes singer) in '15, Indigo Girls in '17, and Virginia's Jason Mraz in '05.

It was opened in 2002 and, in April 2008, was named one of the top five music venues in America by Rolling Stone magazine. At the end of 2009, the venue opened Pulp, a downstairs members-only liquor bar. Pulp is open every night there is a show, and a live feed is piped in to allow patrons to view and listen to the show occurring upstairs. Pulp is also open various other nights for events featuring local artists and "Slice of Life" open-mic comedy nights.

External links
 
 

Music venues in North Carolina
Culture of Asheville, North Carolina
Buildings and structures in Asheville, North Carolina
Tourist attractions in Asheville, North Carolina
Music venues completed in 2002
2002 establishments in North Carolina